Heather Mae Forsyth  (born August 1, 1950) is a former Canadian politician. She was named interim leader of the Wildrose Party on December 22, 2014, following the defection of the previous leader, Danielle Smith, and eight other MLAs. Forsyth is a former member of the Legislative Assembly of Alberta representing the constituency of Calgary-Fish Creek as a Wildrose Alliance representative. She was a Progressive Conservative until she crossed the floor on January 4, 2010. In the 2012 Alberta general election, Forsyth was reelected along with 16 other Wildrose MLAs to form the Official Opposition. Wildrose Leader Danielle Smith then appointed Forsyth as Health Critic. Forsyth retired from Alberta politics in 2015 after her stint as interim leader of the Wildrose Party.

Political work 
Heather Forsyth was first elected on June 15, 1993, and served for a total of 21 years, 10 months and 21 days. She spent the entire length of her political career representing the Calgary-Fish Creek constituency. Forsyth was a member of the Progressive Conservative party from June 15, 1993, until January 4, 2010, until she crossed the floor to the Wildrose Party, which she remained a part of until her retirement in 2015. While in office, she served as member, chair and deputy chair of numerous standing committees, 56 in total. Forsyth also held positions such as Critic for Service Alberta, Health, Critic for Culture and Community Services, Critic for Employment and Immigration, Critic for Health and Wellness as well as Critic for Seniors. Forsyth also held the position of Solicitor General from March 19, 2001, until November 24, 2004, and was Minister of Children's Services from November 25, 2004, until December 14, 2006.

In 1997, Forsyth led the Task Force on Children Involved in Prostitution and helped submit a report that recommended changes to the Child Welfare Act entitled, Children Involved In Prostitution: Report by The Task Force on Children Involved in Prostitution. In 2000, Forsyth was chair of the Alberta Advisory Committee on Organ and Tissue Donation and Transplantation and was involved with the report entitled A Framework for Action: A Coordinated and Integrated Organ and Tissue Donation and Transplant System for Alberta. In 2007, Forsyth led the Crime Reduction and Safe Communities Task Force as chair and submitted the report entitled Keeping Communities Safe: Report and Recommendations.

Forsyth was successful in winning 6 elections over her political career. Typically, Forsyth was elected with substantial leads over her opponents but notably, one of her narrowest victories occurred in the 2012 Alberta general election, where she edged out her main competitor from the Progressive Conservative Party, Wendelin Fraser, by a count of 38 votes. Forsyth is perhaps best known for being named Interim Leader of the Wildrose Party, which occurred after the departure of former Wildrose leader, Danielle Smith and nine other former Wildrose MLAs to the Progressive Conservative party. At the time, Forsyth knew that she would not be seeking reelection due to family reasons, but said that she would be willing to offer her leadership until the next election that would eventually take place on May 5, 2015.

Charity work 
Heather Forsyth is also known for her charity golf tournament: The Peanut Butter Classic. The tournament is an annual women's charity golf tournament. Forsyth founded the charity, which collects and donates jars of peanut butter for the Calgary Food Bank in 2003.  Since its foundation, the Peanut Butter Classic has also raised over 1.7 million dollars for charities in the Calgary area including Alcove, an addictions recovery centre for women that offers accommodations for women and children to keep them together. The charity is entirely oranzized and operated by volunteers. Calgary firefighters have been involved in volunteering at the event since its earliest days. The tournament gives 98% of its proceeds to charity.

Election results

References 

1950 births
Living people
Members of the Executive Council of Alberta
Politicians from Saskatoon
Progressive Conservative Association of Alberta MLAs
Wildrose Party MLAs
Women MLAs in Alberta
20th-century Canadian politicians
21st-century Canadian politicians
20th-century Canadian women politicians
21st-century Canadian women politicians
Women government ministers of Canada